Zdeněk Šebek (born 14 November 1959) is a Czech Paralympic archer and former track and field athlete.

He competed at the 1992 and 1996 Summer Paralympics as a track and field athlete competing in the javelin throw, discus throw and shot put. He also competed in the wheelchair sprints at the 1992 Summer Paralympics where he did not advance into the finals.

For the 2000 Paralympics, he switched from track and field athletics to archery, and had a successful debut in this sport by winning the gold medal in the Men's Individual W1. He has also competed in archery at the 2004 and 2008 Paralympics. At the 2007 wheelchair World Archery Championships, Šebek won gold as part of the Czech Republic team. This was his fourth career gold medal at the World Championships.

References

1959 births
Living people
People from Ústí nad Orlicí
Czech male archers
Czech male javelin throwers
Czech male discus throwers
Czech male shot putters
Czech wheelchair racers
Paralympic archers of the Czech Republic
Paralympic gold medalists for the Czech Republic
Paralympic medalists in archery
Athletes (track and field) at the 1992 Summer Paralympics
Athletes (track and field) at the 1996 Summer Paralympics
Archers at the 2000 Summer Paralympics
Archers at the 2004 Summer Paralympics
Archers at the 2008 Summer Paralympics
Medalists at the 2000 Summer Paralympics
Wheelchair discus throwers
Wheelchair javelin throwers
Wheelchair shot putters
Paralympic discus throwers
Paralympic javelin throwers
Paralympic shot putters